The Affordable Connectivity Program (ACP) is a United States government-sponsored program that aims to provide wireless internet for low-income households. Several companies have signed on to participate in the program, including Verizon Communications, Frontier Communications, Spectrum, AT&T, and Comcast. The program is administered by the Federal Communications Commission. The Infrastructure Investment and Jobs Act provides $14.2 billion in funding for $30 subsidies for those with low incomes, and $75 subsidies on tribal lands.

United States Secretary of Commerce Gina Raimondo and North Carolina Governor Roy Cooper introduced the $45 billion Internet for All initiative in Durham, North Carolina on May 13, 2022. The Broadband Equity, Access and Deployment program will provide each state with $5 million for planning and $100 million for expansion, with states having a greater need receiving more money. The legislature of each state must approve. Funding is also provided by the Infrastructure Investment and Jobs Act.

References 

How to Apply for Affordable Connectivity Program ?

2022 in the United States
2022 in American politics